This is the court that has jurisdiction over probate and family matters in Middlesex County, Massachusetts.  It has two locations: 208 Cambridge Street and 121 Third Street, both in Cambridge, Massachusetts.

Jurisdiction 
The Middlesex Probate and Family Court has "exclusive jurisdiction over probate matters such as wills, trusts, guardianships, and conservatorships. The Court also has jurisdiction over family-related matters such as divorce, support, paternity establishment, family abuse protection, elderly abuse protection, disabled person's abuse protection, custody and adoption."

References 

Massachusetts state courts
Government of Middlesex County, Massachusetts
Family courts
Probate courts in the United States
Courts and tribunals with year of establishment missing